G3-b (also G3b, G3 b, GIIIb) is one of the three pyramid companions Pyramid of Menkaure. It is located on the south side of the  Menkaure pyramid in the Giza Necropolis. It is the middle of the three pyramids of the queens, and in the structure the body of a woman was discovered. The American archaeologist George Andrew Reisner speculated that the queen buried in the pyramid may have been Menkaure's half-sister, Shepsetkau, the daughter of Meresankh III and Khafre.

The pyramid was built during the Fourth Dynasty of Egypt, presumably for one of the wives of Menkaure. The surface of the pyramid is stepped, consisting of four platforms that decrease toward the top. The pyramid's base is  square.

See also 
 List of Egyptian pyramids
 Pyramid G3-a
 Pyramid G3-c

References

Bibliography 
 
  (Note: This is the second unpublished follow-up to Reisner's work A History of the Giza Necropolis Vol. I, published by Harvard University Press)

External links 
 Pyramid G3-b at Digital Giza

Pyramids in Egypt
Pyramids of the Fourth Dynasty of Egypt